Soursweet is a 1988 British film directed by Mike Newell. The screenplay was written by Ian McEwan from the 1982 novel Sour Sweet by Timothy Mo.

Plot
The story, set in the 1960s, is a comedy drama about a young Hong Kong Chinese couple who emigrate to England and start a family. Initially Chen works long hours in a Chinese restaurant while his wife Lily looks after their baby, dreaming of the day when they can open their own business. When Chen becomes indebted to Triads through gambling he decides it is time for his family to go at it alone.

Cast 
 Sylvia Chang as Lily
 Danny Dun as Chen
 Jodi Long as Mui
 Soon Tek-Oh as 'Red' Cudgel
 Jim Carter as Mr. Constantinides
 William Chow as White Paper Fan
 Shih Chieh King as Night Brother

Honours
Golden Hugo (Best Feature Film) - Chicago International Film Festival (nominated)

References

External links

1988 films
1988 comedy-drama films
British comedy-drama films
Films about immigration
Films based on British novels
Films directed by Mike Newell
Films set in London
Films with screenplays by Ian McEwan
1988 comedy films
1988 drama films
British Chinese films
1980s English-language films
1980s British films